Boogardie may refer to:
 Boogardie, Western Australia, an abandoned town
 Boogardie Station, a pastoral lease and sheep station in Western Australia
 Boogardie quarry, located on Boogardie Station, a deposit of orbicular granite